Gratiana was an ancient city and bishopric in Roman Africa, which remains a latin catholic titular see.

Today Gratiana survives as a titular bishopric and the current archbishop, personal title, is Francisco Escalante Molina, apostolic nuncio to the Republic of the Congo and Gabon.

History 
Gratiana, in modern Tunisia, was among the many towns of sufficient importance in the Roman province of Byzacena to become a suffragan of Carthage, but would completely fade, plausibly at the 7th century advent of Islam.

During the Roman Empire the bishopric was centered on a town (now lost to history)  in  the Roman province of Byzacena. Three of its bishops are historically documented :
The Donatist bishop who attended the 411 Council of Carthage. On that occasion the seat had no Catholic bishops. 
Bishop Boniface took part in the synod assembled in Carthage  in 484 by the Vandal king Huneric, after which Boniface was exiled like most Catholic bishops. 
Bishop Gennarus participated in the anti-monotheistic Council of Carthage (641).

Titular see 
The diocese was nominally restored in 1933 as a titular bishopric of Gratiana (Latin) / Graziana (Curiate Italian) / Gratianen(sis) (Latin adjective)

It has had the following incumbents, albeit so far none of the fitting Episcopal (lowest) rank but all archiepiscopal:
 Titular Archbishop Felice Pirozzi (Italian) (1961.10.28 – death 1975.07.25) as papal diplomat : Apostolic Delegate to Madagascar (1960.09.23 – 1967.01.09), Apostolic Nuncio (ambassador) to Venezuela (1967.01.09 – 1970.10.17) and as President of Pontifical Ecclesiastical Academy (1970.10.17 – 1975.07.25)
 Titular Archbishop Luigi Conti (Italian) (1975.08.01 – 2015.12.05) also as papal diplomat : Apostolic Delegate to Antilles (1975.08.01 – 1980.02.09), Apostolic Nuncio to Haiti (1975.08.01 – 1983.11.19), Apostolic Pro-Nuncio to Iraq (1983.11.19 – 1987.01.17), Apostolic Pro-Nuncio to Kuwait (1983.11.19 – 1987.01.17), Apostolic Nuncio to Ecuador (1987.01.17 – 1991.04.12), Apostolic Nuncio to Honduras (1991.04.12 – 1999.05.15), Apostolic Nuncio to Turkey (1999.05.15 – 2001.08.08), Apostolic Nuncio to Turkmenistan (1999.05.15 – 2001.08.08), Apostolic Nuncio to Libya (2001.08.08 – 2003.06.05) and Apostolic Nuncio to Malta (2001.08.08 – 2003.06.05)
 Titular Archbishop Francisco Escalante Molina (Venezuelan) (2016.03.19 – ...) again as papal diplomat : Apostolic Nuncio to Republic of Congo(-Brazzaville) (2016.03.19 – ...) and Apostolic Nuncio to Gabon (2016.05.21 – ...).

See also 
 List of Catholic dioceses in Tunisia
 Gratianopolis (disambiguation) name-related cities, including fellow (titular) sees

References

Catholic titular sees in Africa
Suppressed Roman Catholic dioceses
Roman towns and cities in Tunisia
Archaeological sites in Tunisia
Ancient Berber cities
Ancient cities